Pleuractis is a genus of mushroom corals in the family Fungiidae. Members of the genus are found growing on reefs in the Indo-Pacific.

Taxonomy
Although treated as a subgenus of Fungia by Hoeksma (1989), a 2011 paper elevated Pleuractis to generic level.

Species
The World Register of Marine Species currently lists the following species:

Pleuractis alta (Nemenzo, 1983)
Pleuractis granulosa (Klunzinger, 1879)
Pleuractis gravis (Nemenzo, 1955)
Pleuractis moluccensis (Van der Horst, 1919)
Pleuractis paumotensis (Stutchbury, 1833)
Pleuractis seychellensis (Hoeksema, 1993)
Pleuractis taiwanensis (Hoeksema and Dai, 1991)

References

External links
ReefCorner - Fungia Coral Database Entry

Fungiidae
Scleractinia genera